Honour Amongst Chaos is the third studio album by the Northern Irish Celtic metal band Waylander. It was released in 2008 through Listenable Records, and was the band's first album for seven years. Some versions of the album feature a re-recording of the song Born to the Fight with new lyrics as a bonus track.

Track listing

Band line-up 
Ard Chieftain O'Hagan - vocals
Saul McMichael - guitars
Michael Proctor - bass, backing vocals
Den Ferran - drums, percussion, backing vocals
Dave Briggs - whistle, mandolin, backing vocals

Guest musicians 
Gareth Murdock - additional guitars, backing vocals
Mairtin McCormaic - additional whistle on tracks 2,3, 6, 7, 8
Neil Speers - uilleann pipes
Aidan McGillian - bodhrán
Sarah McGoldrick - flute
Barry Connolly - fiddle

Waylander (band) albums
Pagan metal albums
Listenable Records albums
2008 albums